American Night is a 2021 neo-noir film. It is the feature-length debut of director Alessio Della Valle who also wrote the screenplay.

Plot 
Andy Warhol's famous "Pink Marilyn" painting arrives in New York City triggering a battle between an art dealer and a mafia boss.

Release 
In August 2021, it was announced that Saban Films acquired North American distribution rights to the film.  It premiered at the Venice Film Festival in September 2021 and was released in select theaters in the U.S.

Cast 
Jonathan Rhys Meyers as John Kaplan
Emile Hirsch as Don Michael Rubino
Jeremy Piven as Vincent
Paz Vega as Sarah
Michael Madsen as Lord Samuel Morgan
Fortunato Cerlino as Shaky

Other cast members include Maria Grazia Cucinotta and Marco Leonardi. Singer Anastacia has a cameo appearance to perform the film's title song.

References

External links

2021 films
Italian crime drama films
English-language Italian films
Films scored by Marco Beltrami
Neo-noir
2020s English-language films
Films distributed by Disney